Subakayevo (Sıbaqay) is a rural locality (a village) in Baltiysky Selsoviet, Iglinsky District, Bashkortostan, Russia. The population was 250 as of 2010. There are 7 streets.

Geography 
Subakayevo is located 7 km southeast of Iglino (the district's administrative centre) by road. Iglino is the nearest rural locality.

References 

Rural localities in Iglinsky District